Jean Joseph Beaulard, known as Le Sieur Beaulard (d. after 1775), was a French fashion merchant and fashion designer.

He was one of the four top fashion merchants alongside Rose Bertin, Madame Eloffe and Mademoiselle Alexandre during the reign of Louis XVI, and are described as the rival and predecessor of Rose Bertin as the leading fashion designer in France. He was particularly known for his inventions within hats and headdresses. He had clients within the royal court and aristocracy, and was internationally famous at the time. His most known clients were queen Marie Antoinette and Louis XV's mistress, Madame du Barry.

See also
 Léonard Autié
 Marie Madeleine Duchapt

References

 Caroline Weber, Queen of Fashion: What Marie Antoinette Wore to the Revolution
 Carolyn Sargentson, Merchants and luxury markets: the marchands merciers of eighteenth-century Paris, Victoria and Albert Museum, 1996
 Clare Haru Crowston,  Credit, Fashion, Sex: Economies of Regard in Old Regime France
 Émile Langlade, Rose Bertin, The Creator Of Fashion At The Court Of Marie-Antoinette, 1913

French fashion designers
18th-century French businesspeople
Household of Marie Antoinette
Year of birth missing
Year of death missing